Lantsch/Lenz (Romansh: Lantsch) is a municipality in the Albula Region in the canton of Graubünden in Switzerland.

The majority of its population is Romansh-speaking.

History
Lantsch/Lenz is first mentioned around 850 as Lanzes.

Geography

 
Of this area, 27% is used for agricultural purposes, while 34.4% is forested. Of the rest of the land, 3.8% is settled (buildings or roads) and the remainder (34.8%) is non-productive (rivers, glaciers or mountains).

Until 2017, the municipality was located in the Belfort sub-district of the Albula district, after 2017 it was part of the Albula Region. It consists of the linear village of Lantsch/Lenz. Until 1943 Lantsch/Lenz was known as Lenz.

Demographics
, 12.5% of the population was made up of foreign nationals. Over the last 10 years the population has grown at a rate of 1.5%. Most of the population speaks German (54.2%), with Romansh being second most common (36.7%) and Albanian being third ( 2.5%).

, the gender distribution of the population was 51.6% male and 48.4% female.  The age distribution, in Lantsch/Lenz is; 49 people or 10.1% of the population are between 0 and 9 years old.  32 people or 6.6% are 10 to 14, and 29 people or 6.0% are 15 to 19.  Of the adult population, 36 people or 7.4% of the population are between 20 and 29 years old.  76 people or 15.7% are 30 to 39, 66 people or 13.6% are 40 to 49, and 61 people or 12.6% are 50 to 59.  The senior population distribution is 56 people or 11.5% of the population are between 60 and 69 years old, 61 people or 12.6% are 70 to 79, there are 16 people or 3.3% who are 80 to 89, and there are 3 people or 0.6% who are 90 to 99.

In the 2007 federal election the most popular party was the CVP which received 38.9% of the vote.  The next three most popular parties were the SVP (33.2%), the SPS (16.2%) and the FDP (10.8%).

The entire Swiss population is generally well educated.  In Lantsch/Lenz about 73.7% of the population (between age 25-64) have completed either non-mandatory upper secondary education or additional higher education (either university or a Fachhochschule).

Lantsch/Lenz has an unemployment rate of 2.24%.  , there were 24 people employed in the primary economic sector and about 9 businesses involved in this sector.  25 people are employed in the secondary sector and there are 5 businesses in this sector.  83 people are employed in the tertiary sector, with 31 businesses in this sector.

The historical population is given in the following table:

Heritage sites of national significance

St. Mary's Church in Lantsch/Lenz is listed as a Swiss heritage sites of national significance.

References

External links

 Official website 
 

 
Municipalities of Graubünden
Cultural property of national significance in Graubünden